First Congregational Church is a historic church at 292 E. Market Street in Akron, Ohio.

The current building was built in 1910 and added to the National Register in 2004. The congregation was chartered in 1835, making it Akron's oldest.

It is a part of the United Church of Christ.

References

External links
 Official website

United Church of Christ churches in Ohio
Churches on the National Register of Historic Places in Ohio
Romanesque Revival church buildings in Ohio
Churches completed in 1910
Churches in Akron, Ohio
Churches in Summit County, Ohio
National Register of Historic Places in Summit County, Ohio